Cartouche is a 1962 French adventurer film directed by Philippe de Broca and starring Jean-Paul Belmondo and Claudia Cardinale.

Plot 
In the 18th century, Louis Dominique Bourguignon is working with Malichot's gang but their ways are too 'unethical' for him. He hides out from Malichot and joins the army where he and his two new friends survive by hiding out on the battlefield. Together, they rob the general of his gold. Fleeing, they stop at an inn where they meet Venus, a beautiful gypsy who has been taken prisoner. He rescues her and she joins his gang. Returning to Paris, Bourguignon creates his own gang, acting under the name of Cartouche with most of Malichot's gang joining him. They make audacious robberies of the rich and distribute the loot to the poor. Thus, Cartouche attracts the people's sympathies, Venus's love, and hatred from Malichot and the authorities. Malichot goes to the police to betray Cartouche but Cartouche can escape all the traps they set for him - except the entrapments of love. Eventually, the police use this against him and set a trap while he has a tryst with Venus in the countryside. He is captured but his men ambush the guards as they lead him away. In the scuffle that follows, Cartouche is saved by Venus who sacrifices her life to save him from harm. Cartouche and his men place Venus's body in an expensive carriage they stole earlier from a nobleman and roll the carriage into a lake. As the carriage slowly sinks, Cartouche tells his men to disperse as he vows to avenge the death of his beloved Venus - a way that he anticipates will lead him sooner or later to the gallows.

Cast 
Jean-Paul Belmondo - Louis-Dominique Bourguignon alias Cartouche
Claudia Cardinale - Vénus
Jess Hahn - La Douceur
Marcel Dalio - Malichot
Jean Rochefort - La Taupe
Philippe Lemaire - Gaston de Ferrussac
Noël Roquevert - the recruiting sergeant
Odile Versois - Isabelle de Ferrussac
Jacques Charon - the colonel
Lucien Raimbourg - the maréchal
Jacques Balutin - Capucine, the monk
Pierre Repp - the Marquis of Griffe
Jacques Hilling - the hotel keeper
Paul Préboist - a gendarme
René Marlic - Petit Oncle, the inn keeper

Production
The shooting took place from July 17 to October 6, 1961 in Béziers, Ermenonville and Pézenas. Other locations were Aveyron, Guermantes, Lagny-sur-Marne and Senlis. The film sets were designed by François de Lamothe, and Rosine Delamare was responsible for the costumes.

Reception
The film was a massive success at the French box office.

See also 
Cartouche, King of Paris (1950)

References

External links 
 
 
Cartouche at Le Film Guide

1962 films
French historical adventure films
French adventure drama films
Italian adventure drama films
1960s French-language films
1960s adventure drama films
1960s historical adventure films
Films directed by Philippe de Broca
Films set in the 1710s
Films set in the 1720s
French swashbuckler films
Films scored by Georges Delerue
1962 drama films
1960s French films
1960s Italian films